The Riyadh–Qurayyat line is a railway line in Saudi Arabia that connects the cities of Riyadh and Qurayyat. The 1,242 km line begins at Al-Qurrayat and passes through Al-Jouf, Hail and Al-Qassim regions before terminating in Riyadh. The line shares infrastructure with the SAR North–South Railway line between Buraidah and Al Nafud.

The line was built at an estimated cost of SAR 20 billion. In March 2012, the Saudi Railways Organization (SRO) signed a contract worth SAR 553 million with CAF to design and manufacture six 200 km/h diesel push-pull trains. CAF handed over the first train to the Saudi Railway Company (SAR) in September 2015.

A trial run was conducted on the line between Riyadh and Majmah in October 2016. Passengers services between Riyadh and Qassim began on 26 February 2017. The service will later be expanded to Al-Qurayyat in 2018.

There are six stations on the line: Riyadh, Majma'a, Qassim, Hail, Al-Jawf, and Al-Qurayyat.

See also 

 Transport in Saudi Arabia

References

External links
 SRO North-South line Project
 Daily timetable 9/7/17-23/9/17
 Route Map and Implementation Plan

Railway lines in Saudi Arabia
High-speed rail in Saudi Arabia
High-speed railway lines